Lea Folgueira (born 2 June 1999) is a Luxembourger footballer who plays as a midfielder for Dames Ligue 1 club Jeunesse Junglinster and the Luxembourg women's national team.

International career
Folgueira made her senior debut for Luxembourg on 20 September 2020 during a 0–3 friendly loss to Bulgaria.

References

1999 births
Living people
Women's association football midfielders
Luxembourgian women's footballers
Luxembourg women's international footballers
Luxembourgian people of Portuguese descent